Henry Hatsell (died 1667) was an English naval official and member of parliament in the seventeenth century.

Henry was probably born in Plymouth to a family of merchants. He married Margaret Dawe at Barnstaple on 6 February 1637. Together they had at least one son, Sir Henry Hatsell (1641 - 1714).

Hatsell had a business arrangement with Martin Noell and Thomas Alderne, London businessmen, in the transportation of Royalist prisoners involved in the Penruddock uprising. They were shipped to Barbados, where they were sold as goods and chattels for fifteen hundred and fifty pounds of sugar each on 7 May 1656.

References

English MPs 1659
English MPs 1656–1658
1667 deaths
Members of the Parliament of England (pre-1707) for Devon